Mousemill Bridge is a crossing of the Mouse Water on Mousemill Road, just north of Kirkfieldbank. There are two bridges at the site, the present day road bridge and the old Mousemill Bridge which previously formed part of the road between Lanark and Hamilton through Kirkfieldbank but is today solely used by pedestrians.

Mousemill Old Bridge

The old Mousemill Bridge originated as a wooden bridge and was first mentioned in 1587. A stone bridge replaced the wooden one around 1649. It is a Category B listed building with Historic Environment Scotland, being listed in 1971.

References

Crossings of Mouse Water
Category B listed buildings in South Lanarkshire
Listed bridges in Scotland
Road bridges in Scotland
Bridges completed in 1649